HiPiHi was an online 3D virtual world game founded by Xu Hui and Rao Xuewei in Beijing in the People's Republic of China. It was the first Chinese virtual world game that allowed virtual netizens to freely roam around. Users could explore, trade, communicate and create things in their virtual environment.

History
Founders Xu Hui and Rao Xuewei began exploring the idea in October 2005.  HiPiHi was founded in Beijing on April 17, 2006.  Investments were made by Institutional Angel GCIG on August 8, 2006. Alpha testing began in December 2006.  Beta testing began on March 19, 2007, with approximately 10,000 users. The service appears to have been shut down completely in August 2012.

Challenges
Due to the position of the Chinese government and Beijing's authoritarian policies against Taiwanese independence, Tibetan independence, anti-government criticism and Falun Gong religious groups, this game was expected by some to have major social hurdles. It was uncertain as to how the game would be managed or censored, though founder Xu Hui had a good reputation, including being labeled "Top Ten China Internet Heroes" in 1999 prior to the HiPiHi project.

End of Life
There is very little information known about the reason for the service being shut down but what is known is that in August 2012 all servers related to the service stopped responding and the website was taken offline. There has been no locatable news or information written about the service since that time.

Second Life comparison
The Hipihi virtual world was often compared to the Second Life by the media. Hipihi creator Hui stated in a 2007 interview that "when we started discussing the HiPiHi back to 2005, actually we had no idea about the Second Life. Second Life came to international attention in late 2006, then we study it and find out we both are working for a similar direction". He continued "It is absolutely a misunderstanding of the virtual world if people think HiPiHi is a copycat of Second Life. The virtual world is not just a 3D environment, but a complicate social system including the property policy, financial policy etc."

Competition
There were a number of upcoming competitors including Novoking, Shanghai's Shanda, Uonenet's uWorld, and to some extent perhaps Hong Kong's Frenzoo, although Frenzoo was not precisely the same sort of expansive 3D virtual world that Hipihi was and Shanda and uWorld were expected to be.

See also
 Second Life
 Cyworld
 Culture of the People's Republic of China

References

External links
 HiPiHi official website (English)
 HiPiHi official website (Chinese)

China-exclusive video games
Chinese-language-only video games
Video games developed in China
Virtual world communities